Lord Matthews may refer to:
Hugh Matthews, Lord Matthews (1953-) Scottish judge
Victor Matthews, Baron Matthews (1919-1995) British businessman